The 1998–99 Carolina Hurricanes season was the second season of the NHL franchise in Greensboro, North Carolina. The club qualified for the playoffs for the first time since 1992 (and first time as the Hurricanes), placing first in the NHL Southeast division. The Hurricanes lost in the Eastern Conference Quarterfinals to the Boston Bruins.

Offseason
In a re-organization of the NHL, the club was placed in the new Southeast Division.
Another major headline is the signing of former Hartford Whalers captain Ron Francis

Regular season

The Hurricanes struggled on the power-play during the regular season, finishing 27th in power-play percentage, at 10.99%.

The division was weaker than the Hurricanes' previous division, the Northeast and the Hurricanes were able to win the division and qualify for the playoffs, the only team from the division to do so.

Final standings

Schedule and results

October

Record for the month 4-3-3 (Home 2-1-3 Away 2-2-0)

November

Record for the month 7-7-0 (Home 3-4-0 Away 4-3-0)

December

Record for the month 6-4-2 (Home 4-3-1 Away 2-1-1)

January

Record for the month 6-4-3 (Home 4-1-1 Away 2-3-2)

February

Record for the month 4-5-4 (Home 1-1-2 Away 3-4-2)

March

Record for the month 4-5-4 (Home 4-2-1 Away 0-3-3)

April

Record for the month 3-2-2 (Home 2-0-1 Away 1-2-1)

Playoffs
The Hurricanes drew the Boston Bruins as their first-round opponent. The Hurricanes were defeated in six games.

Eastern Conference Quarterfinals
Carolina Hurricanes (3) vs. Boston Bruins (6)

Player statistics

Regular season
Scoring

Goaltending

Playoffs
Scoring

Goaltending

Transactions
The Hurricanes were involved in the following transactions during the 1998–99 season.

Trades

Free agents

Draft picks
Carolina's draft picks at the 1998 NHL Entry Draft held at the Marine Midland Arena in Buffalo, New York.

Farm teams

American Hockey League

The Beast of New Haven are the Hurricanes American Hockey League affiliate for the 1998–99 AHL season.

East Coast Hockey League

The Florida Everblades are the Hurricanes East Coast Hockey League affiliate.

References
Bibliography
 
 

C
C
Carolina Hurricanes seasons
Hurr
Hurr